The Preview Murder Mystery is a 1936 American mystery-comedy, directed by Robert Florey and shot in the Paramount studio.  The plot follows a studio public relations man who attempts to trap a killer using television technology, allowing on-screen glimpses of technicians like Florey's cinematographer Karl Struss.

Reginald Denny plays Johnny Morgan, the suave head of PR for a movie studio. He is a devoted fan of a mysterious actor who developed a cult following during the silent era.  It is widely believed that it is a tragedy that he died before sound movies became the standard and there are people who see the idea of remaking his films as sound productions as bordering on sacrilege.  From his description, this actor reflected elements of Rudolph Valentino and Lon Chaney, Sr.; he was an exotically handsome leading man and a master of disguise who appeared in many intense, weird roles.

When an attempt is made to remake one of his starring vehicles as a musical, the effort seems cursed, with many accidents happening inexplicably. In time it becomes apparent that a murderer is lurking in the studio, possibly in the fashion of The Phantom of the Opera, and police quarantine the studio.  Executives decide that work should continue on films as the night wears on.  Morgan and a technician hide in a sound editing room and eavesdrop on productions.  There is an iris out effect whenever they tune in to a soundstage and the audience sees the films being shot.

Cast
 Reginald Denny as Johnny Morgan
 Frances Drake as Peggy Madison
 Gail Patrick as Claire Woodward Smith
 George Barbier as Jerome Hewitt
 Ian Keith as E. Gordon Smith
 Rod La Rocque as Neil DuBeck/Joe Walker
 Conway Tearle as Edwin Strange
 Jack Raymond as George Tyson
 Colin Tapley as Studio Manager
 Jack Mulhall as Jack Rawlins
 Bryant Washburn as Carl Jennings
 Franklyn Farnum as James Daley
 Lee Shumway as Chief of Police
 Spencer Charters as Watchman Jones

External links
 

1936 films
Films directed by Robert Florey
Paramount Pictures films
American comedy mystery films
1930s comedy mystery films
1936 comedy films
American black-and-white films
1930s American films
1930s English-language films